Memoria (stylized as məmorᴉa on the poster) is a 2021 fantasy drama mystery film written, directed and co-produced by Apichatpong Weerasethakul, starring Tilda Swinton, Elkin Díaz, Jeanne Balibar, Juan Pablo Urrego and Daniel Giménez Cacho.

The film had its world premiere at the Cannes Film Festival on 15 July 2021, and was given a very limited theatrical release in the United States from 26 December 2021. It was selected as the Colombian entry for the Best International Feature Film at the 94th Academy Awards, though it was not nominated.

Plot
Jessica, a Scottish expatriate to Colombia, awakens one night to a single loud boom. She appears to be the only one who can hear it. The next day, she goes to visit her sister, Karen, who is ill and in a hospital in Bogotá. Jessica operates a market-flower business in Medellín, and is curious to learn more about an excavation project being carried out in the same hospital where her sister is being treated.

Still bothered by the sound, which she hears repeatedly and which prevents her from sleeping, Jessica seeks the help of a young sound engineer named Hernán to recreate the sound. Though unsuccessful at first, the two eventually approximate the sound, and begin a friendly relationship. Right before they are to take a trip together, Jessica looks for Hernán at his sound engineering studio, only to discover that he is not there and no one working there knows who he is.

Finding herself growing increasingly uncomfortable in the company of her now-healthy sister, Jessica ventures out into the countryside alone, where she encounters a middle-aged fish scaler, also named Hernán. This Hernán lives a secluded life, but he speaks frankly with Jessica. They discuss his connection to the earth, his sleep, and their memories. Inside his home, Jessica learns to connect with her memories in a similar fashion to Hernán, and at one point while holding hands, appears to have her memories intertwine with his.

Jessica then approaches an open window and hears the booming sound again, but seems to have grown to accept it and even appreciate it. Suddenly, a camouflaged alien spacecraft rises out of the jungle, leaving a loud sonic boom in its wake. A radio broadcast is heard reporting a mild earthquake that, unbeknownst to the general population, coincided with the take-off of the spacecraft. The broadcast goes on to say that the quake has unearthed previously inaccessible areas that the aforementioned excavation project was searching for.

Cast
 Tilda Swinton as Jessica Holland
 Elkin Díaz as older Hernán Bedoya
 Jeanne Balibar as Agnes Cerkinsky
 Juan Pablo Urrego as younger Hernán Bedoya
 Daniel Giménez Cacho as Juan Ospina
 Agnes Brekke as Karen Holland
 Jerónimo Barón as Mateo Ospina
 Constanza Gutiérrez as Dr. Constanza

Production
In March 2018, it was announced Tilda Swinton had joined the cast of the film, with Apichatpong Weerasethakul directing from a screenplay he wrote. In August 2019, Jeanne Balibar, Daniel Giménez Cacho, Juan Pablo Urrego, and Elkin Diaz joined the cast of the film.

Principal photography began in August 2019, in Colombia.

Release
The film premiered at the 74th Cannes Film Festival on 15 July 2021, and was awarded the Jury Prize.

NEON had acquired US distribution rights in November 2019, and announced a "never-ending" release in the United States, in which it would be "moving from city to city, theater to theater, week by week, playing in front of only one solitary audience at any given time", beginning on 26 December 2021 at New York's IFC Center. The "never-ending" release also brought the film to Chicago at AMC River East 21. NEON later adopted a new release strategy in the US, announcing a simultaneous release that would play in front of many audiences in multiple cities beginning 1 April 2022, with more locations across the US as well as in Canada.

The film was widely released by co-producer and distributor Sovereign Films in the United Kingdom and Ireland on 14 January 2022. Unlike the US theatrical release, the film was released as a regular theatrical release with simultaneous screenings in many cinemas across the UK.

The film was screened at a special screening at the Australian Centre for the Moving Image in Melbourne on 9 December 2021, and went on general release in Australian cinemas on 9 April 2022, distributed by Madman Entertainment.

Common Move acquired Thai distribution rights to the film and it was scheduled for release in cinemas across Thailand on 3 March.

Reception

Box office
The film was initially released in one movie theatre in the United States and Canada. It made $6,797 in its opening weekend and $18,122 in its second.

Critical response
Memoria received critical acclaim.  on review aggregator website Rotten Tomatoes it has a 90% score from 135 reviews, with an average rating of 8.1/10. The consensus states: "Memoria finds writer-director Apichatpong Weerasethakul branching out into English-language filmmaking without forsaking any of his own lyrical cinematic vocabulary". in January 2022 Metacritic reported a score of 91, based on 34 reviews, indicating "universal acclaim". Film critic Jonathan Rosenbaum placed the film on his "Best Films of 2022" list.

Accolades

See also
 List of submissions to the 94th Academy Awards for Best International Feature Film
 List of Colombian submissions for the Academy Award for Best International Feature Film

References

External links
 

2021 films
2021 drama films
2021 fantasy films
2020s American films
2020s British films
2020s English-language films
2020s fantasy drama films
2020s French films
2020s Spanish-language films
American fantasy drama films
British fantasy drama films
Chinese fantasy drama films
Colombian drama films
English-language Chinese films
English-language Colombian films
English-language French films
English-language German films
English-language Mexican films
English-language Swiss films
English-language Taiwanese films
English-language Thai films
Films directed by Apichatpong Weerasethakul
Films set in Colombia
Films shot in Colombia
French fantasy drama films
German fantasy drama films
Magic realism films
Mexican fantasy drama films
Neon (distributor) films
Spanish-language French films
Spanish-language American films
Swiss fantasy drama films
Taiwanese fantasy drama films
Thai drama films
Thai fantasy films
2020s Mexican films